Langau is a town in the district of Horn in Lower Austria, Austria.

Population

References

Cities and towns in Horn District